Chiricahua National Monument is a unit of the National Park System located in the Chiricahua Mountains of southeastern Arizona. The monument was  established on April 18, 1924, to protect its extensive hoodoos and balancing rocks. The Faraway Ranch, which was owned at one time by Swedish immigrants Neil and Emma Erickson, is also preserved within the monument.

Just over 85% of the monument is protected as the Chiricahua National Monument Wilderness.

Visitor center 
A visitor center is located two miles from the entrance to Chiricahua National Monument. The visitor center has exhibits relating to the geology, natural history, and cultural history of the area. A park ranger is available to provide visitors with trail guides and information. Approximately  of trails lead hikers through various ecosystems of meadows, forests, and rock formations.

The visitor center has a free shuttle that leaves each morning at 9:00am. The shuttle takes hikers to the Echo Canyon or Massai Point trailheads. Hikers return to the visitor center by following the designated trails.

Geology
The thick, white-hot ash spewed forth from the nearby Turkey Creek Caldera, cooled and hardened into rhyolitic tuff, laying down almost  of highly siliceous, dark volcanic ash and pumice. The volcanic material eventually eroded into the natural rock formations of the present monument.

Historic Designed Landscape

Chiricahua National Monument Historic Designed Landscape is a historic district that covers roughly 80% of the national monument. The district  was listed on the National Register of Historic Places on October 31, 2008.

It was the 18th property listed as a featured property of the week in a program of the National Park Service that began in July, 2008.

Redesignation as National Park
In 2022, the US Senate passed S. 1320 to redesignate the monument as a national park. The bill did not make it out of committee in the House and died with the conclusion of the 117th Congress.

Missing naturalist
On January 13, 1980, Paul Fugate, a National Park Service naturalist and law enforcement ranger, disappeared after leaving the monument headquarters while in uniform, to check trails leading to the recently acquired Faraway Ranch. An acquaintance claimed to have seen him later that afternoon, slumped between two men in a pickup truck. Despite an extensive search of the rugged  monument area by authorities and search and rescue teams, no trace of him has been found.

Gallery

Climate

See also

 List of national monuments of the United States
 National Register of Historic Places listings in Cochise County, Arizona

References

External links 

 
 Chiricahua National Monument – National Park Service
 The Search for a Ranger Who Was Lost and Never Found April 1, 2021

1924 establishments in Arizona
Chiricahua Mountains
Landforms of Cochise County, Arizona
National Park Service National Monuments in Arizona
Protected areas established in 1924
Protected areas of Cochise County, Arizona
Rock formations of Arizona
Douglas, Arizona
Historic districts on the National Register of Historic Places in Arizona
Geography of Cochise County, Arizona
National Register of Historic Places in Cochise County, Arizona
National Park Service rustic in Arizona